Zita Galic (born 26 July 1962) is a Serbian handball player. She competed in the women's tournament at the 1988 Summer Olympics.

References

External links
 

1962 births
Living people
Serbian female handball players
Olympic handball players of Yugoslavia
Handball players at the 1988 Summer Olympics
People from Ada, Serbia